The 1932 Primera División was the 41st season of top-flight football in Argentina. It continued with both associations organising tournaments: the official AFA season, contested between March 13 and November 13, used the same format as the previous season: a double round-robin format with no relegation at the end of the tournament. The dissident Liga Argentina de Football (LAF, the professional one) started on March 20, with two relegations programmed although a change of rules determined that only Sportivo Palermo was relegated to the second division.

Sportivo Barracas won the amateur Asociación Argentina de Football (AFA) title while River Plate won its second Primera División title after a decisive playoff against Independiente. Víctor Caamaño was the coach of the champion. The topscorer of the LAF was Bernabé Ferreyra of River Plate, who scored 43 goals.

Final tables

Asociación Argentina de Football (AFA)

Liga Argentina de Football

Championship playoff

References

Argentine Primera División seasons
p
p
Argentine Primera Division
Primera Division